Jenna Louise Dreyer (born 7 February 1986 in Port Elizabeth) is a female South African diver, who specialized in springboard and platform events. She is a two-time Olympian, and an honorable All-American mention on the 3 m springboard and 10 m platform, while residing in the United States.

Diving career
Since she left her nation South Africa at age fifteen, Dreyer has been training to compete as an Olympic diver. She moved to Canada to train with a specific diving coach at Boardwalks Club in Victoria, British Columbia, and was homeschooled in order to satisfy South African curriculum, and received her high school diploma from her home nation. After her three-year stay in Canada, Dreyer attended the University of Miami in Florida, where she took up a bachelor's degree in elementary education. She also accepted an invitation to train and become a resident member of the Miami Hurricanes diving team, under head coach Randy Ableman. While attending at the university, Dreyer had received Atlantic Coast Conference (ACC) "Diving of the Year" honors, and an honorable All-American mention on the 3 m springboard and 10 m platform.

At age seventeen, Dreyer made her official debut for the 2004 Summer Olympics in Athens, representing her birth nation South Africa. She reached the semi-finals of the women's springboard event, where she was able to perform an astonishing dive with a total score of 464.43, finishing only in seventeenth place. She also competed for the women's platform, but finished only in thirty-fourth place for the preliminary rounds, with a score of 186.90.

At the 2006 Commonwealth Games in Melbourne, Dreyer narrowly lost the bronze medal to Australia's Kathryn Blackshaw, after finishing fourth in the women's springboard final. She also made her major international debut in diving at the 2007 FINA World Championships, where she registered a score of 250.90 for a thirteenth-place finish in one-metre springboard, and 262.50 for a twenty-third finish in three-metre springboard.

Dreyer qualified for the second time in the women's springboard at the 2008 Summer Olympics in Beijing, by receiving a ticket from the FINA World Diving Cup. During the competition, Dreyer appeared to falter as she bounced on the end of the board, but was farther into her dive to stop. She eventually bounded up into a forward three and a half somersault that she did not quite have a momentum to complete. Following a disastrous performance on her springboard dive, and a zero score from the judges, Dreyer finished the preliminary rounds only in twenty-eighth place, with a score of 210.90.

References

External links
Profile – Miami Hurricanes
NBC 2008 Olympics profile

South African female divers
Living people
Olympic divers of South Africa
Divers at the 2006 Commonwealth Games
Divers at the 2004 Summer Olympics
Divers at the 2008 Summer Olympics
Commonwealth Games competitors for South Africa
Sportspeople from Port Elizabeth
1986 births
Miami Hurricanes women's track and field athletes